Miriam Lyons is an Australian policy analyst, writer and commentator. She was the founding Executive Director of the Centre for Policy Development (CPD), a left-wing think tank set up in 2007.

Career
She has been profiled in The Australian Financial Review's Boss Magazine, and The Australian.

Miriam left her role as Executive Director of the CPD in January 2014 for a sabbatical in Europe, and is now a Fellow of the organisation.

Since 2016, Miriam has been at the activist organisation GetUp! in the role of Climate Justice Co-Director.

External links
 https://cpd.org.au/author/miriam-lyons/

References

Living people
University of New South Wales alumni
1979 births